Winfree may refer to:

People
 Arthur Winfree (1942–2002), American biologist
 Daniel Winfree (born 1953), American lawyer and jurist
 Erik Winfree (born 1969), American biochemist and computer scientist, son of Arthur Winfree
 Juwann Winfree (born 1996), American football player
 Kenny Winfree (born 1954), American singer-songwriter
 William P. Winfree (born 1951), American physicist
 Haystak (born 1973), American hip-hop musician born Jason Winfree
 Vado (rapper) (born 1985), American hip-hop musician born Teeyon Winfree

Places
 Old River-Winfree, Texas, a city in Chambers and Liberty counties, Texas, United States
 Winfree Academy, charter schools in Texas
 Winfree Observatory, an astronomical observatory in Lynchburg, Virginia, United States